Anna B. Miller was an American politician from Laramie, Wyoming who served a single term in the Wyoming House of Representatives. She was elected in 1912, and represented Albany County from 1913 to 1915 as a Democrat in the 12th Wyoming Legislature. Miller represented Albany County alongside Leslie C. John and Joseph Sullivan.

Notes

References

External links
Official page at the Wyoming Legislature

Year of birth missing
Year of death missing
20th-century American women politicians
Democratic Party members of the Wyoming House of Representatives
Women state legislators in Wyoming
People from Laramie, Wyoming